Group E of the 2022 FIFA World Cup took place from 23 November to 1 December 2022. The group consisted of Spain, Costa Rica, Germany, and Japan. The top two teams, Japan and Spain advanced to the round of 16. Japan became the first Asian team to win a World Cup group since themselves in Group H and South Korea in Group D, both in 2002, a tournament both countries co-hosted and the first country to defeat 2 former World Cup teams which became a big upset. Germany was eliminated from the group stage for the second consecutive tournament after going out as defending champions in 2018. They became the second reigning world champions to be eliminated in the group stage of the two subsequent tournaments, following the 2006 winners Italy.

Teams

Notes

Standings

In the round of 16:
 The winners of Group E, Japan, advanced to play the runners-up of Group F, Croatia.
 The runners-up of Group E, Spain, advanced to play the winners of Group F, Morocco.

Matches
All times listed are local, AST (UTC+3).

Germany vs Japan
The two teams had faced each other twice, most recently in 2006 friendly, which finished in a 2–2 draw.
In the 33rd minute, Germany was awarded a penalty when the Japanese goalkeeper fouled David Raum. İlkay Gündoğan scored the penalty with a shot down the middle of the net with the goalkeeper diving to the right.
In the 75th minute, it was 1–1 when Ritsu Dōan scored, finishing a rebound to the net after Manuel Neuer had saved a low shot from the left. Japan went in front eight minutes later when Takuma Asano received the ball down the right wing before running into the penalty area and shooting high to the net from the right of the six-yard box.
The result was the second consecutive time that Germany lost its opening World Cup match after losing 1–0 to Mexico in 2018.

Spain vs Costa Rica
The Spaniards had met the Costa Ricans three times, all of them being friendly matches, with the most recent on Spanish soil: 5–0 in 2017.

Costa Rica tied their worst defeat ever, alongside another 7–0 defeat by Mexico in 1975. This was Spain's biggest win at the World Cup, surpassing the 6–1 win against Bulgaria in 1998.

Japan vs Costa Rica
Japan had met Costa Rica in four friendlies, winning three and drawing one, with their most recent match being a 3–0 victory for the Japanese at Panasonic Stadium Suita on 11 September 2018.
Japan dominated the game but Costa Rica went in front with nine minutes left.
Keysher Fuller scored with a shot from the right which was deflected and misjudged by Japan goalkeeper Shūichi Gonda, it was the only goal in the game.

Spain vs Germany
The teams had met four times in the World Cup, in Germany's 2–1 group stage victory in 1966, 2–1 second group stage victory in 1982, a 1–1 group stage draw in 1994, and Spain's 1–0 semi-final win in 2010.
Dani Olmo shot a shot in the first half that Manuel Neuer turned onto the bar. In the 62nd minute substitute Álvaro Morata put Spain into the lead when he flicked Jordi Alba's cross from the left into the net at the near post.
With seven minutes to go, another substitute Niclas Füllkrug equalized for Germany when he lashed the ball with his right foot high past Spanish goalkeeper Unai Simón from the right. Leroy Sane almost won it for Germany in the added time but the ball was eventually cleared from danger.

Japan vs Spain
The two teams previously faced each other once in 2001, a friendly game in which Spain won 1–0.

In this match, Japan midfielder Ao Tanaka scored a controversial second goal after the ball appeared to go out of play. VAR  took several minutes to confirm that a sliver of the ball stayed in the field, making it a valid goal. The decision proved critical in Japan's surprise topping of Group E and eliminating Germany from the tournament, with Die Mannschaft finishing third despite securing a two-goal victory over Costa Rica in the group's other game. With this win, Japan managed to reach the knockout stage in two consecutive World Cups for the first time ever in their history.

Costa Rica vs Germany
The Germans had played only one previous match against Costa Rica, which served as the opening game for the 2006 FIFA World Cup they hosted. Germany beat their opponent 4–2.

Germany won by the same scoreline, although they were still edged out by Spain due to a far worse goal differential (+1 to +6), with Germany being eliminated from the group stage for the second consecutive tournament after 2018. The same result as Italy did in 2014

Discipline
Fair play points would have been used as tiebreakers if the overall and head-to-head records of teams were tied. These were calculated based on yellow and red cards received in all group matches as follows:
first yellow card: −1 point;
indirect red card (second yellow card): −3 points;
direct red card: −4 points;
yellow card and direct red card: −5 points;

Only one of the above deductions was applied to a player in a single match.

References

External links

 

2022 FIFA World Cup
Spain at the 2022 FIFA World Cup
Costa Rica at the 2022 FIFA World Cup
Germany at the 2022 FIFA World Cup
Japan at the 2022 FIFA World Cup